Ilumäe is a village in Haljala Parish, Lääne-Viru County, in northeastern Estonia.

References
 

Villages in Lääne-Viru County
Kreis Wierland